Robin N. Bawa (born March 26, 1966) is a Canadian former professional ice hockey player who spent parts of four seasons in the National Hockey League between 1989 and 1994.

Playing career
Bawa spent five productive seasons of junior hockey in the WHL with the Kamloops Blazers, but was passed over in the NHL Entry Draft. Finally, after a 57-goal performance in the 1986–87 season, Bawa earned a pro contract from the Washington Capitals.

Bawa turned pro the following season, spending the year in the IHL with the Fort Wayne Komets. While Bawa had been primarily a skill player in junior, he began to fight more often in pro hockey and developed into an enforcer. He averaged over 200 penalty minutes in his first three years in Washington's system, finally earning a five-game callup to the Capitals in 1989–90, during which he scored his first NHL goal, against Alain Chevrier and the Chicago Blackhawks.

Bawa played one more season in the Capitals' system, posting 381 penalty minutes in Fort Wayne but not seeing any more NHL action, before being dealt to the Vancouver Canucks in 1991. He played two games for the Canucks in 1991–92, and set a career high with 27 goals in the IHL. He also dressed up for one game in the 1992 Stanley Cup Playoffs for the Canucks, his only playoff appearance in the NHL.

Early in the 1992–93 season, Bawa was dealt to the San Jose Sharks, where he had his most prolonged NHL stint. He spent most of the rest of the season in the NHL, scoring 5 goals in 42 games and posting 47 penalty minutes.

Bawa was exposed in the 1993 NHL Expansion Draft and claimed by the Mighty Ducks of Anaheim. He played 12 more NHL games in 1993–94, registering his only career assist.

Following his release from the Ducks, Bawa continued to toil in the IHL for five more seasons, three of those back in Fort Wayne, before a concussion ended his career near the end of the 1998–99 season. He finished his IHL career with 147 goals and 175 assists in 565 career games along with 1,869 penalty minutes.

Bawa is the first person of Indian descent to play in the NHL, where he achieved six goals and one assist in 61 games, while collecting 60 penalty minutes.

Career statistics

Regular season and playoffs

Awards and achievements
 WHL West First All-Star Team (1986–87)

See also
List of Indian NHL players

External links

Article profiling hockey players of South Asian origin including Robin Bawa - By Neil Acharya

1966 births
Baltimore Skipjacks players
Canadian expatriate ice hockey players in the United States
Canadian ice hockey right wingers
Canadian sportspeople of Indian descent
Fort Wayne Komets players
Hamilton Canucks players
Ice hockey people from British Columbia
Kalamazoo Wings (1974–2000) players
Kamloops Blazers players
Kamloops Junior Oilers players
Kansas City Blades players
Living people
Mighty Ducks of Anaheim players
Milwaukee Admirals (IHL) players
New Westminster Bruins players
People from Duncan, British Columbia
San Diego Gulls (IHL) players
San Francisco Spiders players
San Jose Sharks players
Undrafted National Hockey League players
Vancouver Canucks players
Washington Capitals players